Sheikh Jaber bin Abdullah (Jaber I or Jaber Al-Aish; 1775 – 1859) was the third ruler of the Sheikdom of Kuwait. He governed from 1814 to 1859. He was the eldest son of Abdullah bin Sabah whom he succeeded upon Sheikh Abdullah's death.

Reign
Jaber's foreign policy was more closely aligned with the Ottoman Empire and opposed to the British. He assisted the Ottoman government in fighting against the Banu Ka'b for control of Basra and Khorramshahr, and rebuffed British attempts to make Kuwait a British protectorate. In 1822, he negotiated an agreement with Ibrahim Pasha that allowed Egyptian ships and caravans to pass through Kuwaiti territory. He sheltered political refugees during his reign, most notably Khalid bin Saud Al Saud from Najd, who fled from his cousin Abdullah bin Thunayan Al Saud.

In 1841, he signed a treaty with the British. The treaty focused on freedom of navigation and opposition to the slave trade.

Legacy 
He was succeeded by his eldest son Sabah II Al-Sabah. 

Jaber I Al-Sabah's children were:

 Sheikh Sabah (the fourth ruler of Kuwait)
 Sheikh Khalifa
 Sheikha Bazza
 Sheikh Salman
 Sheikh Daij
 Sheikh Mujran
 Sheikh Mubarak
 Sheikh Ali
 Sheikh Mohammed
 Sheikh Hammoud
 Sheikh Jarrah
 Sheikh Shamlan
 Sheikh Abdullah

References 

18th-century people from the Ottoman Empire
19th-century people from the Ottoman Empire
18th-century Kuwaiti people
19th-century Kuwaiti people
Rulers of Kuwait
House of Al-Sabah
1770 births
1859 deaths
19th-century Arabs